James John McCloskey (August 25, 1882 – June 5, 1919) was a Major League Baseball pitcher.

He was the first player born in Wyoming to play in Major League Baseball.

He was killed in the Baltimore Mine Tunnel Disaster in Wilkes-Barre, Pennsylvania on June 5, 1919.

References

External links

Major League Baseball pitchers
Philadelphia Phillies players
Omaha Rourkes players
Providence Grays (minor league) players
Baltimore Orioles (IL) players
Wilkes-Barre Barons (baseball) players
Binghamton Bingoes players
Baseball players from Pennsylvania
1882 births
1919 deaths
Accidental deaths in Pennsylvania
Industrial accident deaths
People from Laramie, Wyoming
American coal miners